The Heathcote District Football League (HDFL) is an Australian rules football league based in the Heathcote region and major Bendigo area with clubs based in the regions of City of Greater Bendigo, Shire of Campaspe, and Shire of Gannawarra

History
The Heathcote District Football League became a league in 1955. Previous names for the competitions in the area were the Heathcote District Football Association (1905), McIvor District Football Association (1906) and again the Heathcote District Football Association (1907–1954).

In recent years the Heathcote & District Football League has become one of, if not the strongest of the minor leagues in Victoria. During the Victoria Country Championships (Interleague) the HDFL has accounted for major league side Central Murray Football League as well as established a higher ranking than the North Central Football League. The strength & depth of the league is all the more remarkable considering the size of the league, 9 teams

Over the past few years the HDFL has beaten the Geelong & District & Horsham & District Leagues but fell short to AFL Barwon league, Bellarine in 2016.

The HDFL has had many representatives playing for Victoria Country, including recent players Grant Weeks, Andy Grant, Hadleigh Sirett & Jye Keath.

Clubs

Location

Current clubs

Former clubs

List of Premierships

Recent seasons
The 2021 season ladder prior to abandonment of season:

2021 season

Ladder

Books
 History of Football in the Bendigo District – John Stoward –

References
Notes

Citations

External links
League Official Website

Australian rules football competitions in Victoria (Australia)